KISR (93.7 FM) is a radio station broadcasting a Top 40 (CHR) format. The station serves the Fort Smith, Arkansas, area, and is rebroadcast on translator K241CE (96.1 FM) in Fayetteville, Arkansas. The station is currently owned by Stereo 93, Inc.

KISR was started in 1971 by Fred Baker, Jr., Bernie Baker, and Ed Hopkins III. Its original offices, studio, and transmitter were in the front three rooms of Fred and Bernie Baker's home at 605 North Greenwood in Fort Smith, and the antenna was hung on a utility pole in the backyard. In the market's first Arbitron ratings, KISR had a 32 share compared to the next closest station's 13 share.

KISR currently transmits with 100,000 watts from an antenna 1,200 feet height above average terrain atop Young Mountain, north of Van Buren, Arkansas. Its studios and offices are in Central Mall in Fort Smith, AR.

KISR-HD2
On September 20, 2018, KISR launched an active rock format on its HD2 subchannel, branded as "Rock 94.1" (simulcast on translator K231BS Fort Smith).

KISR-HD3
On September 17, 2018 (after stunting with Free's "All Right Now"), KISR launched a classic rock format on its HD3 subchannel, branded as "101.9 The River" (simulcast on translator K270BR 101.9 FM Fort Smith).

Translators

References

External links
KISR official website
KISR-HD2 official website

ISR
Contemporary hit radio stations in the United States
Radio stations established in 1971